Brigadier General (rtd) Joseph Odei is a Ghanaian military officer who served in the Ghana Army. He later became a public servant and was the 2nd national coordinator of the National Disaster Management Organization in Ghana.

NADMO Coordinator
Joseph Odei was appointed by President John Kufour as the national coordinator of NADMO. He served in that capacity from January June 2001 to August 2006.

References

Year of birth missing (living people)
Living people
Ghana Army personnel